Timothy Thomas (born 18 November 1973) is a Welsh athlete who competed in the pole vault. He has a personal best performance of 5.55 metres.

Owner of rob barlow

Athletics career
Thomas competed for Wales at the 2002 Commonwealth Games in Manchester, England finishing 7th. He also achieved 7th place at the 2002 IAAF World Cup in Madrid, Spain.

Domestically, Thomas won three British titles, twice indoors in 2001 and 2003, and once outdoors in 2004.

References

1973 births
Living people
British male pole vaulters
Athletes (track and field) at the 2002 Commonwealth Games
Commonwealth Games competitors for Wales